The 20th Century Fox Hour is an American drama anthology series televised in the United States on CBS from 1955 to 1957. Some of the shows in this series were restored, remastered and shown on the Fox Movie Channel in 2002 under the title Hour of Stars (its title when the series was originally syndicated after 1957). The season one episode Overnight Haul, starring Richard Conte and Lizabeth Scott, was released in Australia as a feature film.

Characters and stories
Presenting both originals and remakes, The 20th Century Fox Hour was telecast on Wednesday nights at 10pm, alternating each week with The U.S. Steel Hour. Many of the programs were shortened versions of classic 20th Century Fox films, remade with a far lower budget than the originals. Films receiving this treatment included The Ox-Bow Incident, The Late George Apley and Miracle on 34th Street. Some were retitled; Man on the Ledge was a remake of Fourteen Hours (1951).

Guest stars
Guest stars on the series included Bette Davis, Joan Fontaine, Gary Merrill, Thomas Mitchell and Teresa Wright. Steve McQueen made an appearance before he became a major star. Child actor Johnny Washbrook appeared three times on the series while he was also in the lead role of the Western series, My Friend Flicka. Judson Pratt appeared as MacIntyre in the 1956 episode, "The Moneymaker". Child actress Beverly Washburn appeared as Ruthie in "The Hefferan Family" (1956) and as the character Kate as a girl in "Men in Her Life" (1957).

Following his Philco Television Playhouse years, Paddy Chayefsky's The Great American Hoax, starring Ed Wynn, was seen May 15, 1957 during the second season. This script was actually a rewrite of his earlier Fox film, As Young as You Feel (1951) with Monty Woolley and Marilyn Monroe. Lizabeth Scott appeared in the season one episode Overnight Haul. The episode was later released in Australia as a feature film, after her final starring role in 1957's Loving You and many of the films in the series were released in the UK as supporting films in the late 1950s.

Episodes

Season 1

Season 2

References

Brooks, Tim and Marsh, Earle, The Complete Directory to Prime Time Network and Cable TV Shows

External links

The 20th Century Fox Hour at CVTA with episode lists

1955 American television series debuts
1957 American television series endings
1950s American anthology television series
Black-and-white American television shows
CBS original programming
English-language television shows
Television series by 20th Century Fox Television